Punarvasu is a Nakshatra in Hindu astrology, which refers to the two brightest stars in the constellation of Gemini: Castor and Pollux.

Astrology
Punarvasu extends from 20 degrees 00 minutes of Mithun (Gemini) to 03 degrees 20 minutes of Karka (Cancer).

Ramayana
Punarvasu is the birth nakshatra of Lord Rama: 

The word Punarvasu is derived from Puna+ Vasu, which means return, renewal, restoration or repetition. The 12 Adityas were born of Kashyapa in the womb of Aditi. The 12 Adityas are Indra, Vaga, Vayu, Twasta, Varuna, Aryama, Pusa, Mitra, Agni, Parjyanya, Vivaswan and Dinakar. The mother Aditi of whom the Gods are born is the repository of everything good-truth, generosity, magnanimity, purity, aristocracy, beauty and renown. It follows that this star is the cause for these virtues. To start afresh after having once broken off, to start a new life, to come back from a distant land-all. Punarvasu signifies these. It stands for freedom from restriction and limitation, and boundless space.

Naming convention
By the traditional Hindu principle of naming babies according to their Ascendant/Lagna nakshatra, the first names should start with the following Sanskrit letters for those who are born under the Nakshatra: Punarvasu or Punarpoosam

Ke (pronounced as in "Kesari")
Ko (pronounced as in "Kopperuncholan")
Ha (pronounced as in  Ha-ra) for example Harika, Harini, Harshitha, Harish, Haritha,etc.
Hi (pronounced as in "Hi'''ranyakashipu")

See also
List of Nakshatras

References

Gemini (constellation)
Nakshatra